Bernardo Ciriza Pérez (born 1955) is a Navarrese politician, Minister of Territorial Cohesion of Navarre since August 2019.

References

1955 births
Spanish Socialist Workers' Party politicians
Government ministers of Navarre
Living people
Politicians from Navarre